White Girls is a nonfiction book by Hilton Als, published November 5, 2013 by McSweeney's.

Overview
Combining elements of memoir, criticism, fiction and non-fiction, the book's essays create a portrait of "white girls", a category in which Als includes everyone from Truman Capote to Flannery O’Connor and even Malcolm X.  The book explores themes of identity, otherness, commonality, and interpersonal relationships as a kind of "twinship".

Awards

References

2013 non-fiction books
English-language books
American memoirs
Works about White Americans
Books about race and ethnicity

McSweeney's books